Chantal Liseth Martínez Rodriguez (born 28 December 1990) is a Panamanian former professional boxer who competed from 2006 to 2017. She held the WBA female super-bantamweight title from 2011 to 2012 and challenged once for the WBC female super-bantamweight title in 2013.

Professional career
Martínez began her professional career at 15 on 15 July 2006 in El Valle de Antón, where she lost her first fight to Carolina Alvarez of Venezuela and again on 29 December. On 27 April 2007, she won her first fight against Juseth Araúz in Panama City.

In April 2011, Martínez won the 122-pound super bantamweight championship of the World Boxing Association after defeating Trinidadian Lisa Brown. In June of that year, she made her defense of the title and defeated fellow Panamanian Paulina Cardona. In September, she again successfully defended her title by defeating Dominican Marilyn La Cachorrita Hernández, a fight that Romina Arroyo of Argentina refereed.

After a two-year and three month hiatus starting on 20 April 2013 (that day being defeated by Alicia Ashley), Martínez returned to the boxing scene to challenge Liliana Palmera.

References

External links
 

1990 births
Living people
Panamanian women boxers
People from David District
Featherweight boxers